Red Claw is a 2009 science fiction novel by British writer Philip Palmer.

Plot
The plot follows Professor Richard Helms as he heads a team of scientists and soldiers sent to study and document all forms of life on the planet New Amazon. When this is done they will "terraform" the planet - destroy all life and make it fit for human habitation. The team comes under attack and Helms and his followers are forced to flee into the depths of the jungle, where they soon end up fighting for their lives.

Literary significance and reception
The novel received mixed reviews. The Guardian reviewer wrote that "Palmer follows his much-praised debut, Debatable Space, with another riotous, wildly inventive space opera …crawling with over-the-top monsters and crazy biological dangers… Red Claw is that rare treat, an intelligent action adventure replete with intellectual rigour, human insight and superb storytelling."

A review in The Telegraph concluded that "This would make an ideal plot for a shoot ’em up computer game, but as literature it falls short."

References

External links
Official Philip Palmer Web site

2009 British novels
British science fiction novels
2009 science fiction novels
Space opera novels
Orbit Books books